La Calera is a city and commune in the Quillota Province of central Chile's fifth region of Valparaíso.

Geography

La Calera borders Nogales to the north and west, Hijuelas to the east, and La Cruz to the south. 

The city of La Calera is partly enclosed by Route 5 and Route 60.

History
La Calera's name comes from the production of quicklime (Spanish "cal") that is obtained from the processed limestone (Spanish: piedra caliza) (calcium carbonate), extracted from the hills at the south of the town, which were already exploited by the Chilean and Peruvian natives for some 400 years previously. Therefore, La Calera means "quicklime mine".

Established by the Jesuits as a settlement of the Jesuit reduction, the estate of La Calera belonged to the Jesuits up to 1767, to the expulsion of Jesuits by the decree of King Charles III of Spain from 1 March 1767. The Bavarian Jesuit missionary Karl von Haimhausen was prominent in the area's early development. The turning point came in 1842, when it was acquired by Bolivian citizen Ildefonso Huici (father of socialite Eugenia Errázuriz) who started industrialising it using local resources. By 1844, a small town had emerged consisting mainly in a number of workers' dwellings located around the factories and production centres established in it, giving life to what La Calera is today.

Economy
Due to its strategic crossroads location on the central valley and the pioneering and entrepreneurial work of locals and immigrants (Palestinian immigrants, Germans, Italians), La Calera has managed to remain a significant commercial and services centre to the interior of the Valparaiso Region, even though it is not the capital city of the Province. It also remains an important industrial base, employing a fair share of the rural population around it.

Industries and commercial markets
Cemento Melón
Sopraval
Algamar
Falabella Shopping Plaza
Ripley Shopping Plaza

Demographics

According to data from the Census 2002 by the National Statistics Institute, the commune's population was 49,503 inhabitants (24,134 men and 25,369 women). Of these, 47,836 (96.6%) lived in urban areas and 1,667 (3.4%) in rural areas. Its 2007 estimated population was 50,644. La Calera holds 3.21% of the total population of the region. The city's central location in between Santiago de Chile and Valparaiso on the coast made the city of La Calera a true crossroads of industrial development.

Amongst the important immigrant communities set in La Calera before 1950, Palestinians and Italians stand out, which makes the town with the largest proportion of Palestine people in Latin America. The small but well prominent Palestinian community was recently reported in international news media. Even a former Mayor of the city was of Palestinian descent. As mentioned, Italians as well as French immigrants have established a thriving agricultural economy.

La Calera has a mestizo cultural identity and over half the people have some Amerindian ancestry. It is estimated that Spanish descendants and mestizos make up more than 90% of the population.

Notable Caleranos
The demonym for a person from La Calera is Calerano for a man, or Calerana for a woman. Notable Caleranos include:
Eugenia Errázuriz
Elías Figueroa Branden
Manfred Max-Neef

Administration
As a commune, La Calera is a third-level administrative division of Chile, administered by a communal council (Concejo Comunal), which is headed by a directly elected mayor. The current mayor, as of December 2008, is Dr. Eduardo Martínez Machuca (Christian Democrat). The communal council has the following members:
 Trinidad Rojo (RN)
 Margarita Osorio (independent)
 Ricardo Aliaga (DC)
 Gustavo Arancibia (PS)
 Orietta Valencia (PRSD)
 Lautaro Correa (PS)

Within the electoral divisions of Chile, La Calera is represented in the Chamber of Deputies by Eduardo Cerda (PDC) and Andrea Molina (UDI) as part of the 10th electoral district, (together with La Ligua, Petorca, Cabildo, Papudo, Zapallar, Puchuncaví, Quintero, Nogales La Cruz, Quillota and Hijuelas). The commune is represented in the Senate by Ignacio Walker Prieto (PDC) and Lily Pérez San Martín (RN) as part of the 5th senatorial constituency (Valparaíso-Cordillera).

Universities
 Universidad Aconcagua
 Universidad Bolivariana
 CTF Pontificia Universidad Católica de Valparaíso

References

External links
Municipality of La Calera

Communes of Chile
Populated places in Quillota Province
Populated places established in 1844
1844 establishments in Chile